Moyon is a Sino-Tibetan language of Southern Naga linguistic sub branch. It is spoken by the Moyon Nagas in Manipur, India and in Burma.

Classification
Scott DeLancey (2015) classifies Moyon as a "Northwest Kuki-Chin" language.

Geographical distribution
Moyon is spoken in the following locations (Ethnologue).

Chandel district, Manipur: 14 villages including Moyon Khullen, Khongjom, Mitong, Komlathabi, Penaching, and Heigru Tampak
Nagaland (near the Myanmar border)

References

Endangered languages of India
Languages of Manipur
Languages of Nagaland
Southern Naga languages